Louis Joseph "Pete" LePine (September 5, 1876 in Montreal, Quebec, Canada – December 3, 1949 in Woonsocket, Rhode Island, USA) was a Major League Baseball player. A left-handed batter who also threw with his left hand, LePine had a listed height of 5'10" and a listed weight of 142 pounds.

A right fielder and first baseman, LePine spent one season in the majors, as a member of the 1902 Detroit Tigers. He appeared in 30 games, and compiled a .208 batting average and 19 RBI over 108 plate appearances.

External links
LePine's major league statistics at Baseball-Reference.com

1876 births
1949 deaths
Baseball players from Montreal
Canadian expatriate baseball players in the United States
Major League Baseball players from Canada
Detroit Tigers players
Major League Baseball first basemen
Major League Baseball right fielders
Anglophone Quebec people
Albany Senators players
Pawtucket Colts players
New Haven Blues players
Rochester Bronchos players
Holyoke Papermakers players
Holyoke Paperweights players
Hartford Senators players
Waterbury Authors players